Grind Madness at the BBC: The Earache Peel Sessions is a 2009 compilation album released by Earache Records. The compilation is a three-disc set featuring old Peel Sessions from the early pioneers and forerunners of the English grindcore scene.

Track listing

Disc 1

Napalm Death

Extreme Noise Terror

Disc 2

Carcass

Bolt Thrower

Disc 3

Godflesh

Unseen Terror

Heresy

Intense Degree

References

2009 compilation albums
2009 live albums
Peel Sessions recordings
Earache Records compilation albums
Grindcore compilation albums
Death metal compilation albums
Industrial metal albums
Live death metal albums
Live grindcore albums